John Michael Corriden Jr. (January 6, 1918 – June 4, 2001) was an American major league baseball player. He made one appearance in a baseball game with the  Brooklyn Dodgers as a pinch runner on April 20, 1946. He was an outfielder during his minor league career.

He was the son of former Dodger, Chicago Cubs, New York Yankees and Chicago White Sox coach Red Corriden.

See also
List of second-generation Major League Baseball players

External links

1918 births
2001 deaths
Brooklyn Dodgers players
Baseball players from Indiana
Olean Oilers players
Dayton Ducks players
Montreal Royals players
New Orleans Pelicans (baseball) players
Mobile Bears players
Fort Worth Cats players
Jersey City Giants players
Salisbury Pirates players
Sherbrooke Athletics players
St. Jean Braves players